The Lancashire County Football Association, also known simply as the Lancashire FA, is the governing body of football within the historical county boundaries of Lancashire, England. They are responsible for the governance and development of football at all levels in the county.

History and organisation
The Lancashire County FA was formed on 28 September 1878 at a meeting held one Saturday afternoon in the parlour of The Volunteer Inn, Bromley Cross. 

The LFA runs a number of different cup competitions catering for the various levels of football played throughout the county, which is based on the historic county boundaries of Lancashire, before the 1974 county boundary re-organisation, rather than the current administrative county boundaries and so includes Barrow-in-Furness to the north and Manchester, Rochdale, Oldham and Liverpool to the south. Warrington, historically part of Lancashire, is not administered by the Lancashire FA and is instead covered by the Cheshire FA. The administrative area covered by the Lancashire County FA overlaps with areas covered by Manchester FA and Liverpool FA.  According to the Memorandum on Areas and Overlapping of Associations the Manchester FA covers the area 12 miles from Manchester Town Hall and is confined to Lancashire. The Liverpool FA covers 18 miles in Lancashire and 8 miles in Cheshire from Liverpool Town Hall. In addition in an agreement with the Cumberland FA the Lancashire FA received eight clubs in the South Cumberland area of Millom from the end of season 1969/70.

The county is divided into nine areas with each area having one member on the LFA Council. The divisions are as follows:

Division 1: Burnley – Pendle – Rossendale 
Division 2: Blackburn with Darwen – Hyndburn – Ribble Valley 
Division 3: Bolton 
Division 4: Bury – Rochdale 
Division 5: Chorley – Liverpool – West Lancashire 
Division 6: Preston – South Ribble – Blackpool – Fylde 
Division 7: Oldham – Manchester 
Division 8: Barrow – Lancaster – Wyre 
Division 9: St Helens – Wigan – Warrington

The Lancashire FA governs 100 leagues, 4,000 teams and 1,500 referees.

Lancashire County Schools team
In the 2005–06 season the Lancashire County FA Schools team won the English Schools' Football Association Under-16 Inter County Trophy. In the semi-final held at Victoria Park, Burscough, Lancashire beat Leicestershire & Rutland County Schools FA 3–1. They then beat Devon County Schools FA 2–1 in the final which was held at Ewood Park in Blackburn on 11 May 2006.

County Ground
The Lancashire FA are based at the County Ground, Thurston Road in Leyland. They moved their headquarters to the County Ground in 1998 from Blackburn.

The County Ground is the current home of Bolton Wanderers reserve team, who play in the Premier Reserve League and who, in the 2009–10 season, play in the North Division. The club also use the ground for all their home matches in the Manchester Senior Cup. The county representative team and county youth team also use the ground for home matches, and up until the 2009–2010 season County Cup finals were played at the County Ground. The ground has a 500-seater covered stand.

Facilities include an all-weather pitch as well as six corporate rooms, the largest of which, the Tom Finney Suite, can seat up to 100.

Affiliated Leagues

Men's Saturday Leagues
Accrington Combination
Blackburn and District Combination
East Lancashire League
Furness Premier League
Lancashire League
Lancashire Amateur League
Mid Lancashire and District League
North Lancashire & District Football League
Rochdale Alliance League
SportsReach League
West Lancashire League

Ladies and Girls Leagues
 Lancashire FA Women's County League
 Lancashire Girls League
 West Lancashire Girls League

Other Leagues
Bolton Sports Federation Over 35 Veterans League	
Lancashire Ability Counts
Lancaster University Inter College Men’s League

Men's Sunday Leagues
Blackburn Sunday League
Blackpool and Fylde Sunday Alliance
Burnley and District Sunday League
Bury and District Sunday League
Chorley Nissan Sunday League 
Harry Dewhurst Memorial Sunday League
Middleton and District Sunday League
Lancashire Evening Post Sunday League
Ormskirk and District Sunday League
Pendle Charity League
Skelmersdale and District Sunday League
South Lancashire Counties League

Small Sided Leagues
Blackburn Community 7-a-side League
Furness Futebol – Barrow-in-Furness 	
Lancashire FA County 6ixes
PSL Soccer Leagues
Soccer Burnley 5's
Soccer Sixes
- Blackburn
- Lancaster
- Morecambe
- Preton
 Leisure Leagues 
- Garstang 
- Longridge 
- Colne

Youth Leagues
Lancashire FA Under 18 Floodlight League
Accrington and District Junior League
Barrow and District Junior League
Blackpool and District Youth 
Bolton and Bury Junior Football League
Bury & Radcliffe Junior League
East Lancashire Alliance
Craven Minor Junior League
Central Lancashire Junior League
Lancaster and Morecambe Service to Youth League
Lune and District Junior League
Mid Lancashire Colts Junior League
North Bury Junior League
North Valley Youth League
Poulton and District Primary League
Preston City Development League
Rochdale and Oldham Youth League
Skelmersdale Junior League
Warburton Youth League
Wigan & District Youth League

Disbanded Leagues

A number of leagues that were affiliated to the Lancashire FA have disbanded or amalgamated with other leagues including:

Lancashire Combination
Bolton & District Amateur Combination
Bolton Boys and Girls Federation
Fylde District League
Lancashire Palatine League
Lancaster and Morecambe Grassroots Sunday League
Leigh & District Amateur League
Morecambe & Lancaster Sunday Football League
Preston Churches League
Blackburn & Darwen Junior League
Hindley & District Junior League
Hyndburn & District Boys League

Members

Full members
There are 79 clubs who have full membership of the Lancashire FA. These are –

Accrington Stanley
A.F.C. Blackpool
A.F.C. Darwen
AFC Fylde
Ashton Athletic
Atherton Collieries
Atherton Laburnum Rovers
Atherton Town
BAC/EE/Springfields
Bacup Borough
BAE Systems Barrow
Bamber Bridge
Barrow
Blackburn Rovers
Blackpool
Blackpool Wren Rovers
Blackrod Town
Bolton Wanderers
Bolton Wyresdale
Breightmet United
Bridge Celtic FC, Adlington

Burnley
Burnley United
Burscough
Bury
Charnock Richard
Chorley
Clitheroe
Collegiate Old Boys
Croston Sports Club
Daisy Hill
Dalton United
Eagley
Everton
Fleetwood Town
Fulwood Amateurs
Golborne Sports
Hesketh Bank
Hesketh Casuals
Hindsford
Holker Old Boys

Lancashire Constabulary
Lancaster City
Leigh Genesis
Liverpool
Lytham St. Annes & Fylde YMCA F.C.
Manchester City
Manchester United
Marine
Merseyside Police
Mill Hill St. Peters
Morecambe
Nelson
Norcross & Warbreck
Old Blackburnians
Old Boltonians
Old Xaverians
Oldham Athletic
Oldham Hulmeians
Padiham
Poulton Town

Preston North End
Prestwich Heys
Radcliffe Borough
Ramsbottom United
Rochdale
Rochdale Town
Rochdale St. Clements
Rossendale United
Skelmersdale United
Southport
Southport Trinity
Squires Gate
Tranmere Rovers
Turton
Walshaw Sports
Whalley Range
Wigan Athletic
Woodbank
Wyre Villa
Wythenshawe Amateurs

Associate members
Clubs who are associate members of the Lancashire FA include:-

Coppull United
Euxton Villa

Fleetwood Hesketh
Freckleton

Freehold
Garstang

Kendal Town
The Pleasant Inn (Royton)

County Cups
The Lancashire FA currently organises nineteen County Cup competitions.

Recent Lancashire County FA Cup Competition Winners

References

External links

County football associations
Football in Lancashire
Sports organizations established in 1878
1878 establishments in England